Road Burners is motorcycle racing arcade game developed and released by Atari Games and Midway Games in 1999. It features a tilting motorcycle and the ability to be hooked to other like machines for up to 8 simultaneous players.

Gameplay
The player's score is based upon the distance accumulated in the time limit. Players must pass checkpoints to earn additional time.

Tracks in the game include Washington, D.C., Paris, London, Las Vegas, and the Isle of Man.

References

1999 video games
Arcade video games
Arcade-only video games
Atari arcade games
Midway video games 
Motorcycle video games
Video games developed in the United States